The RMS Teutonic was an ocean liner built for the White Star Line in Belfast and was the first armed merchant cruiser.

History

Background
Construction of Teutonic and Majestic began in 1887. When Teutonic was launched on 19 January 1889, she was the first White Star ship without square rigged sails. The ship was completed on 25 July 1889 and participated in the Spithead Naval Review on 5 and 6 August, in conjunction with the state visit of Kaiser Wilhelm II.

Although Queen Victoria remained aboard the royal yacht, the Kaiser was given a two-hour tour of the new ship hosted by the Prince of Wales, the future Edward VII. During the tour, Wilhelm is reputed to have turned to a subaltern and remarked: "We must have some of these ..."
The Kaiser's reaction is generally credited as the impetus for the creation of Germany's four funnel liners known as the Kaiser Class.

Eight years later, Teutonic also participated in the 1897 Spithead Naval Review honoring Queen Victoria's Diamond Jubilee.

Teutonic was built under the British Auxiliary Armed Cruiser Agreement, and was Britain's first armed merchant cruiser, sporting eight 4.7" guns. These were removed after the military reviews, and on 7 August 1889, she left on her maiden voyage to New York City, replacing Baltic in White Star's lineup. The following year City of Paris took the honour away, and no White Star ship would regain it. Both Teutonic and her sister were extremely profitable liners, and the two ships made crossings full to passenger capacity several times.

Specifications

Whereas all of White Star's previous liners had only carried two classes of passengers, Cabin and Steerage, Teutonic and Majestic introduced changes to that paradigm. Both ships were built with the three-class accommodation system, consisting of First, Second and Third Classes. First Class, originally known as Cabin Class, was renamed as Saloon Class on specific terms, being meant for upper class passengers.

Teutonic had accommodations for 300 First Class passengers in spacious cabins situated on her uppermost three decks, and had many interesting features. Many of the cabins were inter-connecting for family travel. A new class began appearing in ships after this time in shipbuilding, and Teutonic was among the first to see it. Second Class, also known as Cabin Class, was meant for middle class passengers. Teutonic was built to carry 190 Second Class passengers in comfortable rooms on the second highest deck, further aft towards the stern. Third Class, commonly known as steerage, was primarily for immigrants. Teutonic was built to carry 1,000 Third Class passengers in two areas of accommodation aboard the ship. As was the case aboard all White Star vessels, Third Class spaces were segregated with single men berthed forward, and single women, married couples and families with children berthed aft. In a layout similar to what was seen aboard Britannic and Germanic, steerage passengers were quartered in nine separate compartments on the two lowest decks, with five forward and four aft. All five forward sections and three of the four aft sections consisted of large twenty-berth cabins lining the ship's hull, with interior spaces left open to be used for dining and other purposes. The fourth section in the stern, designated for married couples and families with children, consisted of small but comfortable and private two and four-berth cabins.

Career

During the first 18 years of service, both Teutonic and Majestic, along with their older cousins Britannic and Germanic sailed on the route from their home port of Liverpool to New York City. Each ship made on average one sailing per month, and averaged 11–14 sailings each season. The White Star Line had it planned so as they could operate a weekly service across the North Atlantic. Each week a ship sailed from Liverpool on a specific day, commonly Wednesday or Thursday. From there, they would stop at the port of Queenstown (now Cobh), Ireland, to pick up more passengers. Records have shown that Teutonic and her partner ships picked up as many as 800 Irish immigrants in a single stop, as the White Star Line was very popular in Ireland because most of their ships, including Teutonic, were Irish built. 

After Queenstown, the ships would then continue on the long voyage to New York, almost 2,500 miles of open sea. Once passengers were disembarked at either the White Star Line pier in New York or the immigration centre at Castle Garden, and later on Ellis Island, the ship would be prepared for her return voyage.

Transatlantic races between the Teutonic and liner City of New York were common in the 19th-century. They usually began in either Queenstown Harbour or New York Harbor. On August 14, 1890, the Teutonic beat the City of New York by over three hours, and broke the ocean record by coming from Queenstown in 5 days, 19 hours, and 5 minutes, and breaking the record by 13 minutes.

In 1897 Teutonic reassumed her military role for a review commemorating Victoria's 60th anniversary. In 1898, she had a minor collision in New York Harbor with the United States Lines' Berlin, but neither ship suffered major damage.

During the Boer War in 1900, she served as a troop transport. In 1901, Teutonic encountered a tsunami, which washed two lookouts out of the crows nest who survived. The tsunami hit at night, so there were no passengers up on deck.

In 1907 Teutonic, along with Majestic, Oceanic and the new Adriatic was transferred to White Star's new 'Express Service' between Southampton and New York via Cherbourg and Queenstown. In 1911, the ship was replaced in the White Star lineup by the new Olympic and transferred to sister company Dominion Line for Canadian service. At the end of her career on White Star's UK-US services, she had carried a total of 209,466 passengers westbound and another 125,720 eastbound. By 1913 Teutonic's age meant that she no longer attracted the top class passengers, and so was refitted to carry only second and third class passengers. In October 1913 the ship narrowly avoided the same fate as Titanic when, at 172 miles east of Belle Isle off the Newfoundland coast, she ran so close to an iceberg that she avoided collision only by reversing her engines and putting the helm hard aport. According to the 29 October 1913 issue of the Chicago Tribune, "the liner passed within twenty feet of the iceberg. The fog was so thick that even at that small distance the berg could scarcely be distinguished. It was so close that there was danger that the propeller of the ship would strike it as the vessel went around. The passengers were not aware of their peril until it had been averted. They signed a testimonial to the captain and his officers expressing their gratitude and admiration for the care and skill displayed by them."

In 1914, with the start of World War I, Teutonic became a merchant cruiser once again, being commissioned into the 10th Cruiser Squadron. In 1916, she was refitted with 6" guns, and served as a convoy escort ship as well as being used for troop transport.

In 1921, Teutonic was scrapped at Emden.

References

External links

White Star Ships
Great Ocean Liners
Detailed record of sailings on Norway Heritage
Historical overview
Video dedicated to RMS Teutonic

Blue Riband holders
Ships built in Belfast
Passenger ships of the United Kingdom
Steamships
Ships of the White Star Line
World War I Auxiliary cruisers of the Royal Navy
1889 ships
Ships built by Harland and Wolff